RA-TV is a Bosnian local commercial Cable television channel based in Jelah (Tešanj), Bosnia and Herzegovina. The program is mainly produced in Bosnian language.

References

External links 
 RA-TV in Facebook

Television stations in Bosnia and Herzegovina
Television channels and stations established in 2013
Companies of Bosnia and Herzegovina
Companies established in 2013
Mass media in Tešanj